Edward "Lalo" Delgado (born January 23, 1998) is an American soccer player who currently plays as a goalkeeper for Northern Colorado Hailstorm in the USL League One.

Career

Youth and college 
Delgado played four years of college soccer at Westmont College between 2016 and 2019.

While at college, Delgardo also appeared for USL PDL side Ventura County Fusion in the summers.

Professional 
On March 4, 2020, Delgado signed for USL Championship side Las Vegas Lights. He made his debut on March 7, 2020, starting in a 1–1 draw with San Diego Loyal SC. On April 1, 2021, Delgado signed with Phoenix Rising FC, also of the USL Championship.

On 23 January 2023, Delgado signed with Northern Colorado Hailstorm FC of USL League One.

References

External links 
 
 
 Westmont profile

1998 births
Living people
American soccer players
Soccer players from California
Association football goalkeepers
Ventura County Fusion players
Las Vegas Lights FC players
Phoenix Rising FC players
Northern Colorado Hailstorm FC players
USL Championship players
USL League Two players